7 Aviation Support Battalion REME is a battalion of the Royal Electrical and Mechanical Engineers of the British Army.

History
The battalion was formed in 1992, as a regular REME battalion, from 8 Close Support Company, 71 Close Support Company, 73 Close Support Company, and 72 (Depth) Company. The battalion went on to deploy to Iraq and Afghanistan, to support both 24th Airmobile Brigade and 16th Air Assault Brigade.

Structure
The battalion's current structure is as follows:
Battalion Headquarters
Eschelon Company
70 Field Company
71 Aviation Company
132 Aviation Support Squadron RLC

References

Battalions of the Royal Electrical and Mechanical Engineers
Military units and formations established in 1992